Churm is a surname. Notable people with the surname include:

Sarah Churm  (born 1980), English actress
Stephen Churm (born 1954), Australian sailor
Michael Churm,  British Paralympic athlete